Júlio Alexandre Bacelar Oliveira Ferreira (born 29 April 1994) is a Portuguese taekwondo practitioner from Braga, who competes in the men's –74 kg (lightweight) category. He has won multiple medals in international competitions, including gold at the 2016 European Championships and bronze at the 2015 European Games (–80 kg). In addition, he achieved a 5th place at the 2015 World Taekwondo Championships.

References

1994 births
Sportspeople from Braga
Portuguese male taekwondo practitioners
European Games bronze medalists for Portugal
European Games medalists in taekwondo
Living people
Taekwondo practitioners at the 2015 European Games
Mediterranean Games bronze medalists for Portugal
Mediterranean Games medalists in taekwondo
Competitors at the 2018 Mediterranean Games
Universiade medalists in taekwondo
Universiade bronze medalists for Portugal
Medalists at the 2019 Summer Universiade
European Taekwondo Championships medalists
21st-century Portuguese people